John A. Galvin (1842-1904) was a professional baseball player who played second base for the  Brooklyn Atlantics team of the NAPBBP. He played in one game and was 0 for 4.

References

External links

Major League Baseball infielders
Brooklyn Atlantics (NABBP) players
New York Mutuals (NABBP) players
Brooklyn Atlantics players
19th-century baseball players
1842 births
1904 deaths
Burials at Holy Cross Cemetery, Brooklyn